"You Think" is a song performed by South Korean girl group Girls' Generation. It was released on August 19, 2015, as the third single from the group's fifth studio album Lion Heart by S.M. Entertainment.

Composition
"You Think" was described by Jeff Benjamin from Billboard as a hip hop-friendly song featuring trap beats. Meanwhile, Arirang deemed it a "powerful pop dance song". The song's arrangement features high-pitched belts and brassy horns that were described to "create subtle, siren-like tones on the irresistible dance break." Lyrically, the song expresses a woman's warning towards a former male lover, who spreads bad rumors about her after they have broken up. In an interview, Girls' Generation member Seohyun described the song as an opportunity to "demonstrate Girls' Generation's performance and vocal skills properly".

Music video
The video has Girls' Generation members portrayed as cool, mature women with the choreography of the song being its main highlight. Jeff Benjamin from Billboard stated, "Staying in line with the top-notch choreography shown in 'Catch Me If You Can,' the video again sees Girls' Generation attempting more intricate routines than they have in years — to must-watch results." The choreography employed several moves including "leg spreads, athletic twirls, sensual hair flips and booty pops" and was choreographed by Kyle Hanagami.

Charts

Release history

Credits 
Credits are adapted from Lion Heart liner notes.

Studio 
 SM LVYIN Studio – recording
 SM Yellow Tail Studio – mixing
 Ingrid Studio – recording, digital editing, additional vocal editing
 doobdoob Studio – recording
 Sterling Sound – mastering

Personnel 

 SM Entertainment – executive producer
 Lee Soo-man – producer
 Kim Young-min – executive supervisor
 Girls' Generation – vocals, background vocals
 Cho Yoon-kyung – lyrics
 MQ – lyrics
 Sara Forsberg – composition, arrangement
 Dante Jones – composition, arrangement
 Brandon Sammon – composition, arrangement
 Denzil "DR" Remedios – composition, arrangement
 Ryan S. Jhun – composition, arrangement
 Jussi Ilmari Karvinen – composition, arrangement
 Kenzie – vocal directing
 Lee Ji-hong – recording
 Jung Eun-kyung – recording, digital editing, additional vocal editing
 Kim Eun-cheol – recording
 Gu Jong-pil – mixing
 Tom Coyne – mastering

References

External links 
 

Girls' Generation songs
Songs with feminist themes
2015 singles
Hip hop songs
SM Entertainment singles
2015 songs
Songs written by Sara Forsberg